MacGillycuddy's Reeks is a sandstone and siltstone mountain range in the Iveragh Peninsula in County Kerry, Ireland.

The range was heavily glaciated which carved out deep corries (e.g. the Eagle's Nest), U-shaped valleys (e.g. Lough Coomloughra), and sharp arêtes and ridges (e.g. the Beenkeragh Ridge).

The range, part of the Reeks District, is a destination for mountain walkers and climbers and includes some of Ireland's most regarded walking routes such as the 15–kilometre Coomloughra Horseshoe, and the 26-kilometre MacGillycuddy's Reeks Ridge Walk that traverses the full range; it is estimated that over 140,000 people visit the range each year.  The entire range is in private ownership; however, reasonable access is given for recreational use.

Geology

MacGillycuddy's Reeks are composed of sandstone particles of various sizes which are collectively known as the Old Red Sandstone.  The rocks date from the Upper Devonian period (310–450 million years ago) when Ireland was in a hot equatorial setting.  During this 60 million year period, Ireland was the site of a major basin, known as the Munster basin, and the counties of Cork and Kerry were effectively a large alluvial floodplain.  Chemical oxidation stained the material with a purple–reddish colour (and green in places from chlorination), still visible today.  There are virtually no fossils in Old Red Sandstone.  The composition of Old Red Sandstone is variable and contains quartz stones, mudstones, siltstones, and sandstone particles (boulders of conglomerate rock containing quartz pebbles are visible throughout the range).  The Reeks were also subject to significant glaciation which led to fracturing of the rock, and resulted in deep corries (e.g. the Eagle's Nest), U-shaped valleys (e.g. Lough Coomloughra), and sharp arêtes and ridges (e.g. the Beenkeragh Ridge).

Geography

MacGillycuddy's Reeks are variously described as consisting of two main sections, containing all ten of the Reeks that are above 3,000 ft:

The Eastern Reeks meet the Coomloughea Reeks at the col of the Devil's Ladder, a popular ascent route for Carrauntoohil.

All but one of these eleven 3,000 ft peaks, namely Cnoc an Chuillinn East Top, are amongst the list of thirteen Irish Furths—peaks which meet the Scottish Mountaineering Club's criteria for a Munro, and they are therefore also known as Irish Munros.

There are 29 peaks in the range above  in height. The range contains 14 Irish Hewitts (height above 2,000 ft and prominence above 30 metres), and 16 Irish Arderins (height above 500 metres and prominence above 30 metres).  The range is also known for its sharp aretes, including The Bones arete, more famously known as the Beenkeragh Ridge, and The Big Gun arete.

A feature of the range is the modest topographic prominence, or "drop" between many of its peaks.  Only two of the eleven Reeks over 3,000 ft meet the Marilyn classification of a mountain (a prominence above 150 metres), namely Carrauntoohil and Cnoc na Péiste.  The only Reek that meets the P600 classification (a prominence above 600 metres), is Carrauntoohil itself.  The combination of high peaks and low prominence, means the ridges between the peaks are at a sustained height (e.g. why the prominence is so modest), which has contributed to the popularity of ridge walking in the Reeks, particularly, the Coomloughra Horseshoe, and the MacGillycuddy's Reeks Ridge Walk, and the term, "Ireland's highest mountain range".

Ownership

The entire range is held in private ownership, both in individually owned freehold parcels in the lower reaches and in commonly owned, open upland zones (‘commonage’). A State-sponsored report into access for the range in December 2013 titled MacGillycuddy Reeks Mountain Access Development Assessment (also called the Mountain Access Project, or MAP), mapped the complex network of land titles.  Unlike many other national mountain ranges, the MacGillycuddy's Reeks are not part of a national park or a trust structure.

The private ownership has led to issues around the upkeep of popular paths in the Reeks, most particularly the erosion of the Devil's Ladder path, which is used to summit Carrauntoohil; and various car-parks and bridges used by climbers.  The 2013 MAP report noted the importance of safety in light of the increasing climbers and walkers to the Reeks.  The MAP report stated that Kerry Mountain Rescue ("KMR") logged 17 fatalities on the Reeks between 1966 and 2000, or about one every second year, but since 2000, KMR had been logging approximately 2 fatalities per annum.

In 2019 the Irish Times reported that the MacGillycuddy Reeks Mountain Access Forum, a cross-body group of landowners, commercial users and public access and walking groups set up in 2014 with the aim of "protecting, managing and sustainably developing the MacGillycuddy's Reeks mountain range, while halting and reversing the obvious and worsening path erosion", had achieved some success laying down new pathways in the Hag's Glen approach to Carrauntoohil; however, the Irish Times still wondered, "Should the Kerry reeks be a national park?".

Naming

However, in the English form, the name is translated as "MacGillycuddy's Reeks" (the translation used in Gasaitéar na hÉireann). The English name is sometimes incorrectly written as "The MacGillycuddy's Reeks", "MacGillycuddy Reeks", or "Macgillycuddy's Reeks".

The MacGillycuddy were a sept, or branch, of the O'Sullivan Moore clan.  The MacGillycuddy is recorded as being one of a smaller number of Gaelic chieftains whose lands were returned post the Cromwellian confiscations, which explains why the name survives to this day. The MacGillycuddy family tomb is at Kilgobnet (Kerry), between the mountains and Killorglin.  The clan chief, McGillycuddy of the Reeks, owned land in this part of Munster until the end of the 20th century. The word reek is a Hiberno-English version of the English word rick, meaning a stack.

Recreation

Visitors

Jim Ryan's 2006 book on the Reeks, Carrauntoohil and MacGillycuddy's Reeks: A Walking Guide to Ireland's Highest Mountains, stated that there were 25,000 annual visitors to the Reeks.  The 2013 MAP report quoted Ryan's figures, which were cited in the MAP's Terms of Reference, but stated that: "The Reeks are accessed by at least 25,000 recreational users per annum. It is highly likely that the numbers are a factor of 4 times higher based on observation of the year-round level of usage – but data is required to ascertain the visitor numbers." It was estimated that 125,000 visitors entered the range in 2017 from footfall at three main access points, and that 140,000 entered in 2018 by recording footfall at four main access points.

Hill walking

The most common reason for visiting the Reeks is to climb Ireland's highest mountain, Carrauntoohil.  The popular route starts from Cronin's Yard and enters the Hag's Glen to climb the Devil's Ladder (the col between Carrauntoohil and Cnoc na Toinne), from which the summit is accessed. A more challenging route is via the Hag's Tooth Ridge which circles the Eagle's Nest, and takes in Beenkeragh, and the Beenkeragh Ridge.

MacGillycuddy's Reeks is particularly regarded for the quality of its ridge walking routes, with the 6–8 hour  Coomloughra Horseshoe, that circles Lough Coomloughra, considered "one of Ireland's classic ridge walks", which takes in all three of Ireland's  peaks, namely, Carrauntoohil, Beenkeragh, and Caher (East Top and West Top), as well as the famous Beenkeragh Ridge.

The most challenging route is the full MacGillycuddy's Reeks Ridge Walk, a 12- to 14-hour,  traverse of the entire range.  The route normally starts at the eastern end from Kate Kearney's Cottage in the Gap of Dunloe.  The route takes in Stickeen Mountain and Cnoc an Bhráca before reaching the ridge proper at Cruach Mhór.  From there it continues along the narrow arete of The Big Gun to Cnoc na Péiste, and continuing along the chain of Maolán Buí, Cnoc an Chuillinn, Cnoc na Toinne to the summit of Carrauntoohil.

From Carrauntoohil, a number of variations are possible, the main one being a detour to Beenkeragh before returning along the same route to get to Caher and then on to Caher West Top before descending to the Hydro-Track car park near Lough Acoose, Glencar.

An alternative variation is to continue from Beenkeragh on the northern side of the Coomloughra Horseshoe to the peaks or Skregmore and Cnoc Íochtair before descending to the Hydro-Track car park.

Rock and winter climbing

MacGillycuddy's Reeks are not especially known for their rock-climbing routes, unlike Ailladie in Clare or Fair Head in Antrim. The  rock climbing grade Very Difficult (V-Diff), Howling Ridge up the central arete between the east and north-east faces of Carrauntoohil is notable.  The north-east face of Carrauntoohil (e.g. the Eagle's Nest area), is better known for its winter climbing, conditions permitting, offering 80 routes with 7 up to winter Grade V.

List of peaks

The following is a download from the MountainViews Online Database, which lists 29 identifiable Reeks with an elevation, or height, above .

See also

Lists of mountains in Ireland
List of Irish counties by highest point
List of mountains of the British Isles by height
List of P600 mountains in the British Isles
List of Furth mountains in the British Isles
List of highest points of European countries
List of countries by highest point

References

Further reading

External links
MountainViews: The Irish Mountain Website
Hill Bagging UK & Ireland, the searchable interface for the DoBIH
Winter Climbing around Carrauntoohil, The Irish Climbing Wiki
Ordnance Survey Ireland ("OSI") Online Map Viewer
MacGillycuddy's Reeks Mountain Access Forum, group tasked with developing the range
Hag's Glen, MacGillycuddy's Reeks, aerial photograph of the central Reeks.

Mountains and hills of County Kerry
Iveragh Peninsula